Jenn Shapland is an American writer and archivist. Her essay "Finders, Keepers" won a Pushcart Prize in 2017, and her memoir, My Autobiography of Carson McCullers, won the Lambda Literary Award for Lesbian Memoir in 2021.

Personal life 
Shapland lives in New Mexico. She received her PhD in English from the University of Texas at Austin.

Career 
Aside from writing, Shapland is an adjunct instructor in the Creative Writing Department at the Institute of American Indian Arts in Santa Fe, as well as an archivist for a visual artist.

My Autobiography of Carson McCullers (2020) 

My Autobiography of Carson McCullers is a memoir, published February 4, 2020 by Tin House Books. The book received the following accolades:

 National Book Award for Nonfiction finalist (2020)
 Lambda Literary Award for Lesbian Memoir/Biography winner (2021)
 Stonewall Book Award honor book (2021)
 Christian Gauss Award (2021)

References 

Living people
Writers from New Mexico
Institute of American Indian Arts faculty
LGBT memoirists
University of Texas at Austin alumni
Year of birth missing (living people)